Kemao Market is one of five major electronics markets in Zhongguancun, Beijing.

History
Kemao Market opened its doors on February 21, 2004. The building is rated 5A-class and features a four-star hotel.

See also
Dinghao Market
Hailong Market

References

External links

Official site

Economy of Beijing
Tourist attractions in Beijing
Zhongguancun